Tisonia is a genus of flowering plants belonging to the family Salicaceae. It is also in the subfamily Salicoideae and tribe Saliceae.

It is native to Madagascar.

The genus name of Tisonia is in honour of Eugène Édouard Augustin Tison (1842–1932), French doctor and professor of botany. 
It was first described and published in Bull. Mens. Soc. Linn. Paris Vol.1 on page 568 in 1886.

Known species
According to Kew,

References

Salicaceae
Salicaceae genera
Plants described in 1886
Endemic flora of Madagascar